The 1987 Mississippi State Bulldogs football team represented Mississippi State University during the 1987 NCAA Division I-A football season. The Bulldogs finished 4–7 in head coach Rockey Felker's second season.

Schedule

References

Mississippi State
Mississippi State Bulldogs football seasons
Mississippi State Bulldogs football